Epermenia fuscomaculata is a moth of the family Epermeniidae. It is found in Japan (Kyushu) and Taiwan.

The ground colour of the forewings is whitish-grey, the basal area mottled with black scales. The hindwings are pale grey.

Etymology
The specific name refers to the brownish maculations on the forewing.

References

External links

Moths described in 2006
Epermeniidae
Moths of Japan
Moths of Taiwan